Nagina Masjid, Agra Fort, Uttar Pradesh, India.

Nagina Masjid may also refer to:

 Nagina Masjid, Champaner, Gujarat, India
 Nagina Masjid Akot Stand, a mosque in Akola, Maharashtra, India
 Nagina Masjid, a mosque in Kishangarh Renwal, Rajasthan, India
 Nagina Masjid, a mosque in Karanja Lad, Maharashtra, India

See also 
 Rani Sipri's Mosque, also known as Masjid-e-Nagina, in Ahmedabad, Gujarat, India